Lechbruck is a municipality in the district of Ostallgäu in Bavaria in Germany. It lies on the west bank of the river Lech.

References

Ostallgäu